R Canis Majoris is an eclipsing interacting binary star system in the constellation Canis Major. It varies from magnitude 5.7 to 6.34. The system is unusual in the low ratio between the main two components and shortness of the orbital period.

Eclipse timings

Eclipse timings for R Canis Majoris have been being measured since 1887, and whilst at present the time period appears constant at 1.1359 days, periodic quasi-sinusoidal variations of the eclipse arrival times have been taking place with a periodicity of around 93 years. This has led to the suggestion that there exists a third non-eclipsing body in the system whose gravitational pull is responsible for these variations.

Interacting binary star
R Canis Majoris is thought to be an interacting binary star. The secondary star has exceeded its Roche lobe and accreted mass to the primary star. This has resulted in the early evolution of the secondary star into the subgiant branch, and increased helium rich material in the primary, causing it to burn brighter and have a higher effective temperature than would usually be expected for a star of its mass.

Reanalysis of the system using high-resolution spectroscopy yields its two main components to have masses 1.67 ± 0.08, and 0.22 ± 0.07 times that of the Sun respectively and radii 1.78 ± 0.03 and 1.22 ± 0.07 times that of the Sun respectively. Their surface temperatures are 7300 and 4350 K. The third star has a mass 80% that of the Sun and a radius around 83% that of the Sun.  A third star in the system is very faint, presumably a red dwarf.

References 

Eclipsing binaries
G-type subgiants
F-type main-sequence stars
M-type main-sequence stars
Canis Majoris, R
Durchmusterung objects
057167
035487
2788
Canis Major